Kanni Thai is a 1965 Indian Tamil-language action adventure film directed by M. A. Thirumugam, starring M. G. Ramachandran. The film was produced by Sandow M. M. A. Chinnappa Thevar and released on 10 September 1965.

Plot 

In a military camp, captain Saravanan promises to his brother-in-arms, captain Moorthy, dying person (seriously wounded following an exchange enlivened against poachers on the Indian border) to take care of his 6-year-old daughter Rani. Saravanan and Rani begin a big trip through the country, full of pitfalls. Because of his swiftness, Saravanan realises that who his daughter protects is the leader of an evil group. But they do not fall only upon ill-intentioned people, quite the opposite, Saravanan and Rani  meet on their way, Sarasu, a young woman without ties, devoid of any bad feelings, which will spare no effort, such as being mother for Rani and will devote herself as an affectionate partner for Saravanan. Together, for the girl Rani, they are going to surmount all the numerous obstacles which wait for them on the road.

Cast 
 M. G. Ramachandran as Captain Saravanan
 M. N. Nambiar as Rakka
 S. A. Ashokan as D. Vasu
 Nagesh as Estate manager's son
 V. K. Ramasamy as Estate manager
 Sandow M. M. A. Chinnappa Thevar as Kali
 K. R. Vijaya as Suguna
 Jayalalithaa as Sarasu
 Manorama as Rukku alias Rukkumani
 P. K. Saraswathi as Saravanan's mother
 Baby Shakila as Rani
 Chandhrakantha (Guest-Star) as Nirmala

Soundtrack 
The soundtrack was composed by K. V. Mahadevan and all the lyrics were written by Panchu Arunachalam.

Release and reception 
Kanni Thai was released on 10 September 1965. The Indian Express called the story "lacklustre", its narration "mawkish" and the dialogue "gibberish". T. M. Ramachandran of Sport and Pastime wrote, "The picture has its flaws and improbable and illogical sequences but director M A Thirumugam has made the film somewhat interesting with a racy treatment and with both eyes on the box-office."

References

External links 
 

1960s action adventure films
1960s Tamil-language films
1965 films
Films directed by M. A. Thirumugam
Films scored by K. V. Mahadevan
Indian action adventure films